Sathiyamangalam   is a village in the Annavasal revenue block of Pudukkottai district, Tamil Nadu, India.

Demographics 

 census, Sathiyamangalam had a total population of 3355, with 1678 males and 1677 females. Out of the total population 1903 people were literate.

References

Villages in Pudukkottai district